Der Sprung über den Schatten is a 1924 opera by Ernst Krenek. The work parodied expressionism and psychoanalysis, and prefigured Jonny spielt auf in including jazz elements.

Cast
 Prince Kuno, reigning prince (bass)
 Princess Leonore, his wife (soprano)
 Countess Blandine, her chambermaid (mezzo-soprano)
 Odette, her maid (soprano)
 Dr. Berg, hypnotist (baritone)
 Marcus, private investigator (tenor)
 Laurenz Goldhaar, a poet (tenor)
 A chamberlain of the prince (tenor)
 A cavalier (tenor)
 Captain of the castle watch (bass)
 Four judges (2 tenors, 2 basses)
 One of the crowd (tenor)
 A waiter (speaking role)
 A chamberlain, an advocate (silent roles)

Recording
1989  Kuno: Thomas Brüning, Prinzessin Leonore: Lynda Kemeny, Comtesse Blandine: Susan McLean, Odette: Diana Amos, Dr. Berg: John Pflieger, Marcus: Ulrich Neuweiler, Laurenz Goldhaar: Jörg Dürmüller; Bielefeld, de David de Villiers CPO

References

1924 operas
Operas
German-language operas
Operas by Ernst Krenek